Charles Derek Bond (4 July 1927 – 20 July 2018) was a British Anglican bishop, the Bishop of Bradwell, from 1976 until 1993, during which time the diocese's area scheme was founded in 1983.

Biography
Bond was educated at Bournemouth School and King's College London before embarking on an ecclesiastical career with a curacy at St Peter-le-Poer, Friern Barnet. After  incumbencies at Harringay and Harrow Weald he was appointed Archdeacon of Colchester before being elevated to the episcopate.

In retirement he continued to serve the Church as an assistant bishop – first within the Diocese of Worcester and then in the Diocese of Chelmsford. He died on 20 July 2018 at the age of 91.

References

1927 births
2018 deaths
People educated at Bournemouth School
Alumni of the Theological Department of King's College London
Associates of King's College London
Archdeacons of Colchester
Bishops of Bradwell
20th-century Church of England bishops